She Qiutong (born March 19, 1993) is a Chinese female curler.

Teams

References

External links

Living people
1993 births
Sportspeople from Harbin
Chinese female curlers

Competitors at the 2011 Winter Universiade
Place of birth missing (living people)
21st-century Chinese women